Belize competes at the 2009 World Championships in Athletics from 15–23 August in Berlin.

Results

References

External links
Official competition website

Nations at the 2009 World Championships in Athletics
World Championships in Athletics
Belize at the World Championships in Athletics